Fiona Jane Dawson (born 31 July 1977) is a writer, producer, and film director. She is best known for the documentary TransMilitary, which premiered at SXSW Film Festival in 2018 and won the Audience Award. Dawson is an Emmy-nominated documentarian and has lived in America since 2000.

Career 
In 2015, Dawson was commissioned by The New York Times to direct and produce the short opinion documentary, Transgender at War and in Love. The film was released on June 4, 2015 on The Times’ Op-Doc platform and was positioned that day on the publication’s website home page. The film’s success earned Dawson the honor of being an LGBT Artist Champion of Change awarded by The Obama White House. The film won The White House News Photographers Association's Best Documentary, was nominated for a GLAAD Award in the Outstanding Digital Journalism – Multimedia category, and was a nominee for Outstanding Short Documentary in the 37th Annual News & Documentary Emmy. The film’s characters Senior Airman Logan Ireland and Corporal Laila Villanueva were interviewed on The Ellen Show and participated in a private reception in The White House with President Obama, making Senior Airman Ireland the first openly transgender service member to walk the halls of the White House in uniform. Fiona continued working with director Gabriel Silverman and created the full-length feature documentary TransMilitary which follows Senior Airman Logan Ireland, Corporal Laila Villanueva, Captain Jennifer Peace and First Lieutenant El Cook. The film premiered at SXSW Film Festival in 2018 and won the Best Feature Documentary Audience Award. Dawson has served on the National Board of Directors of the Human Rights Campaign and the Board of Directors for NLGJA - The National Lesbian and Gay Journalist Association.

Awards 

 2009 Houston's Female Grand Marshal for the 2009 LGBT Pride Parade.
 2015 Identified as an LGBT Artist Champion of Change by The White House.
 2016 Emmy Award Nominee for Transgender, at War and in Love.
 2016 GLAAD Award Outstanding Digital Journalism – Multimedia category.
 2018 SXSW Best Feature Documentary Audience Award for TransMilitary.

Personal life 

Dawson is originally from Lincolnshire in the United Kingdom and emigrated to the United States in 2000 becoming a US citizen in 2008. Fiona lives in Austin, Texas, is openly bisexual, and advocates for the LGBTQ+ community.

References 

Living people
American human rights activists
British emigrants to the United States
American LGBT writers
American LGBT rights activists
Women civil rights activists
American documentary film directors
LGBT film directors
1977 births